Carukia barnesi is an extremely venomous jellyfish found near Australia. Stings can result in Irukandji syndrome, and this species is commonly known as Irukandji jellyfish, although this name does not distinguish it from other Irukandji jellyfish such as Malo kingi.

A mature C. barnesi's bell is only  in height.

The species was discovered by Jack Barnes of Cairns, Australia. While on an exploration mission aimed at determining the reason for Irukandji syndrome, Barnes allowed himself, a lifeguard, and his 9-year-old son to be stung by the jellyfish.

Carukia barnesi is a soft-bodied marine organism. This species falls within the Medusozoa subphylum and the Cubozoa class. It is a type of "box jellyfish" that is known for producing potent venom and is known for inflicting the Irukandji syndrome.

Threat to Humans: The Irukandji syndrome was first discovered after a group of swimmers were stung in the open water near North Queensland, Australia. Victims of the sting reported severe symptoms of muscle aches, back pain, nausea, headaches, chest and abdominal pains, sweating, high blood pressure and difficulty breathing. Intravenous administration of pethidine is used to treat patients with this syndrome.

Most reported incidents have been localized to Australia during the warm summer season. Due to the small size of C. barnesi (approximately 20 mm in diameter and 25 mm in depth of the bell), they often go undetected in the open water.

Description 
The structure of C. barnesi follows that of a Box Jellyfish- it has a square-shaped bell structure and long tentacles that extend out of its base. The tentacles house the nematocysts which are stinging cells. Type I nematocysts (homotrichous microbasic rhopaloids) and Type II (homotrichous haplonemes) nematocysts are both found on the tentacles and bells of the species. These cells are also capable of producing venom that changes composition as C. barnesi matures to adulthood. Studies with SDS gel- electrophoresis have found that the protein composition of the venom increased as these jellyfish altered their prey from invertebrates (zooplankton and crustaceans) to vertebrates.

C. barnesi feeds by stinging its prey through nematocysts and injecting venom. Once the prey is paralyzed and in captivity, muscle cells in the tentacles will aid the jellyfish to bring food closer to its mouth. At the mouth, the food can enter a gastric cavity and be digested.

Life cycle 
Cubozoans follow a life cycle that alternates between young benthic sessile polyps and adult motile pelagic medusae. The cycle begins with a planula larvae. This planula will continue to swim until it finds a substrate that it can use as support. Once the planula attaches to a substrate like a coral reef or rock, the organism will morph into a polyp. This polyp can remain asexual for extended periods of time. Eventually, the polyp will begin to clone and form a polyp colony. As it continues to acquire nutrients, the colony will develop into an adult medusa.

References

External links

Carukiidae

Cnidarians of Australia
Animals described in 1967